Nadie me dirá como quererte (No one will tell me how to love you) is a Venezuela telenovela written by Martín Hahn and produced by Radio Caracas Televisión in 2008. It is inspired by the work Ifigenia of Teresa de la Parra.

Marianela González and Hugo Vásquez star as the main protagonists, while Dora Mazzone, Juan Carlos Alarcón and Raquel Yanez star as the main antagonists.

Plot 
María Eugenia Alonso is a woman who returns from France to Venezuela after learning of the death of her father. Although she has character and an advanced mentality, she discovers that her father left her inheritance in ruin, and she is forced to depend on her uncle and aunt Antonia Aristiguieta who despises her niece for her beauty and ideas. While adapting to her new way of life, she meets Gabriel Olmedo, a recently graduated doctor, passionate and persevering with whom she shares her revolutionary ideas. María Eugenia is a strong advocate for women's rights and gender equality. However, his aunt introduces him to César Leal, a wealthy, very macho entrepreneur who is willing to conquer her no matter what happens, thus putting her love for Gabriel in jeopardy.

Cast 
Marianela González as María Eugenia Alonso
Hugo Vásquez as Gabriel Olmedo
Juan Carlos Alarcón as César Leal
Dora Mazzone as Antonia de Aristigueta
Raquel Yánez as Rita Monasterio
Javier Vidal as Eduardo Aristigueta
Hilda Abrahamz as Mercedes de Galindo
Llena Aloma as Magnolia
Nestor Bravo as Mateo Vargas
Aileen Celeste as Cristina Iturbe
Laura Chimaras as Ana Teresa Galindo
Ivette Domínguez as Purita
Lance Dos Ramos as Carlos Emilio Aristigueta
Guillermo Dávila as Francisco Alonso
Juan Carlos Gardié as Alberto Galindo
Margarita Hernández as Clara Aristigueta
Enrique Izquierdo as Adalberto
Kiara as Laura Carbonell
Alberto López as Alcalde Prudencio
Yelena Maciel as Isabelita Pérez
Carlos Marquez as El Juez
Alejandro Mata as Ulices Stephanopolus
Héctor Peña as Pedro Aristiguieta
Rosario Prieto as Gregoria Salas 
Eben Renan as Tomás
Betty Ruth as Eugenia Aristigueta
Freddy Salazar as El Cura
Jalymar Salomón as Fernanda
Lucía Sanoja as Esperanza Santelíz 
Gonzalo Velutini as Doctor
Manuel Villalba as Ministro Monasterios
Diana Volpe as Ligia

References

External links 

2008 telenovelas
2008 Venezuelan television series debuts
2009 Venezuelan television series endings
Spanish-language telenovelas
RCTV telenovelas
Venezuelan telenovelas
Television shows set in Caracas